Patti Reynolds (born May 28, 1948) is an American model and actress who was Playboy magazine's Playmate of the Month for its September 1965 issue (at the age of 17). Her centerfold was photographed by Stan Malinowski. She also appears in a photograph on page 56 dated 1960 (along with Ashlyn Martin and two other bunnies) in The Bunny Years by Kathryn Leigh Scott, for which she also wrote a short bio of herself.

Reynolds was born in Chicago, Illinois. In January 1966, she was subpoenaed by a Federal grand jury investigating the crime syndicate in Chicago. Also subpoenaed were reputed underworld figures Fiori (Fifi) Buccieri, 59, and Charles (Chuckie) English, 52. Reynolds was identified by Federal authorities as an intimate friend of Frank (the Horse) Buccieri, 52, the brother of Fiori.

See also
 List of people in Playboy 1960–1969

References

External links
 

1948 births
Living people
Actresses from Chicago
1960s Playboy Playmates
21st-century American women